Johanna Priglinger (19 October 1986 – 13 November 2022) was an Austrian politician. A member of the Austrian People's Party, she served in the Landtag of Upper Austria from 2013 to 2015.

Priglinger died on 13 November 2022, at the age of 36.

References

1986 births
2022 deaths
Austrian People's Party politicians
Members of the Landtag of Upper Austria
Politicians from Linz
21st-century Austrian politicians
21st-century Austrian women politicians